The Downtown Neligh Historic District, in Neligh, Nebraska, is a historic district which was listed on the National Register of Historic Places in 2017.

It is generally along Main St. from 5th to 2nd Streets in Neligh.

A map of the district shows it runs from 202 to 502 on the west side of Main Street, and somewhat less far on the east side, and it includes a few buildings on the cross streets.

References

Historic districts on the National Register of Historic Places in Nebraska
National Register of Historic Places in Antelope County, Nebraska
Buildings and structures completed in 1873